Nakhal or Nakhl is a wilayah in Al Batinah South Governorate in Oman. It is home to many old castles and forts, including the Nakhal Fort.

Notable people

 Abdullah Al Hilali, international football referee.

References 

 
Populated places in Oman